Acheilognathus tabira is a species of ray-finned fish in the genus Acheilognathus. The species is endemic to Japan.

Subspecies 
There are 5 subspecies in the species Acheilognathus tabira.
Acheilognathus tabira erythropterus
Acheilognathus tabira jordani
Acheilognathus tabira nakamurae
Acheilognathus tabira tabira
Acheilognathus tabira tohokuensis

References 

Acheilognathus
Fish described in 1914
Freshwater fish of Japan
Taxa named by David Starr Jordan